Horšice is a municipality and village in Plzeň-South District in the Plzeň Region of the Czech Republic. It has about 400 inhabitants.

Administrative parts
The village of Újezd is an administrative part of Horšice.

Gallery

References

Villages in Plzeň-South District